Dangerous Medicine is a 1938 British crime film, directed by Arthur B. Woods and starring Elizabeth Allan and Cyril Ritchard.  It is now classed as a lost film.

Plot
Secretary Victoria Ainswell (Allan) marries her wealthy elderly boss.  Soon after the wedding he dies suddenly in suspicious circumstances, and the autopsy reveals that the police have a murderer on their hands.  Everything points to Victoria as the only person with means, opportunity and motive, and as she can provide no sensible explanation as to who else could have killed her husband, she is arrested and put on trial for murder.

Victoria is found guilty and sentenced to hang.  As she is being driven back to prison, the car is involved in a serious road accident.  Victoria is critically injured and is rushed to hospital, where brilliant doctor Noel Penwood (Ritchard) fights desperately against the odds to save her life.  He finds a shard of glass has pierced her heart, and has to perform extremely risky surgery to remove it.

Once the operation is over and Victoria is off the danger list, Penwood learns that she faces execution.  He is appalled by the horrendous irony that he has saved her life so heroically, only for it to soon be taken anyway through process of law.  As Victoria recovers, he listens to her story, believes in her innocence and starts to fall in love with her.  Against all ethics, he smuggles her out of the hospital and puts her in hiding.  The now romantically-involved couple do some sleuthing of their own, and finally stumble on the identity of the real killer.  The police are extremely grateful and apologetic, and Victoria is exonerated, leaving her free to pursue the romance with Penwood.

Cast
 Elizabeth Allan as Victoria Ainswell
 Cyril Ritchard as Dr. Noel Penwood
 Edmund Breon as Totsie Mainwaring
 Anthony Holles as Alistair Hoard
 Aubrey Mallalieu as Judge
 Basil Gill as Sir Francis
 Leo Genn as Murdoch
 Gordon McLeod as Mr. Buller
 Frederick Burtwell as Mr. George
 Allan Jeayes as Superintendent Fox

Reception
The Monthly Film Bulletin opined the film was a "improbable story" that was "briskly told, and opens with a clever and ingeniously staged scene at the Old Bailey." The review noted "resourceful direction, crisp and pointed dialogue" and that "the settings are varied and attractive and the production qualities excellent" The review commented on the acting noting that "Elizabeth Allen was "competent" while Edmond Breon "steals every scene in which he appears".

References

External links 
 
 Dangerous Medicine at BFI Film & TV Database

1938 films
1938 crime films
British crime films
Films directed by Arthur B. Woods
Lost British films
British black-and-white films
1938 lost films
1930s English-language films
1930s British films